The Basketball Championship of Bosnia and Herzegovina is the top–tier men's professional basketball league in Bosnia and Herzegovina for men and women, respectively. The league is operated by the Basketball Federation of Bosnia and Herzegovina.

Competition format
The league is composed of 12 teams, each playing against the other eleven two times, home and away. After this portion concludes, the top six clubs are joined by the country's representatives in the Adriatic League, and enter "League 6". The best of these four teams go to the playoffs, and in the final best-of-five series, the Bosnian champion is crowned.

The eight teams who do not make the playoffs go on to compete in the "relegation league," where a team's object becomes maintaining its standing and ability to play in the competition the following year.

The women's league has ten clubs and operates in a similar way, in the final "League Six".  Meanwhile, the teams not in the playoff race play to avoid relegation.

Title holders
Prior to 1998, there were three separate leagues in Bosnia-Herzegovina, divided by ethnicity.  Since then, there has been a unified league and a single champion each year.

 1999–00 Borac Nektar Banja Luka
 2000–01 Igokea
 2001–02 Feal Široki
 2002–03 Feal Široki
 2003–04 Široki Hercegtisak
 2004–05 Bosna ASA BH Telecom
 2005–06 Bosna ASA BH Telecom
 2006–07 Široki HT Eronet
 2007–08 Bosna ASA BH Telecom
 2008–09 Široki Prima pivo
 2009–10 Široki TT Kabeli
 2010–11 Široki TT Kabeli
 2011–12 Široki WWin
 2012–13 Igokea Laktaši
 2013–14 Igokea Laktaši
 2014–15 Igokea Laktaši
 2015–16 Igokea Laktaši
 2016–17 Igokea Laktaši
 2017–18 Zrinjski Mostar
 2018–19 Široki
 2019–20 Igokea Laktaši
 2020–21 Široki
 2021–22 Igokea Laktaši

Titles by club

Current teams

See also
Basketball Cup of Bosnia and Herzegovina
Second level basketball leagues in Bosnia and Herzegovina

References

External links
 

 
2
Bosnia